Budysko is a village in Ukraine. Founded in 1882, it is located in Zviahel Raion, Zhytomyr Oblast. Its territorial location code (KOATUUI) is 1820656301. Its population is 15 people as of 2001. Its postal index is 12742. Its telephone calling code is 4144

Village council
The village council is located at 12734, Ukraine, Zhytomyr Oblast, Baranivka Raion, township (urban-type settlement) Polyanka

External links
 Budysko on website High Rada of Ukraine 

Populated places established in 1882
Villages in Zviahel Raion